Nancy Ekwulira Achebe  is a Nigerian professor of library and information science. She is the first vice president of the Nigerian School Library Association (NSLA) and the current head of the department of Library and Information Science at the University of Nigeria, Nsukka (UNN). She has also been the director of the School of General Studies at UNN, and has published about 70 articles in journals and newspapers.

Educational background  
Achebe earned her first degree in education in 1984 from University of Nigeria, Nsukka (UNN). She then earned a master's degree in library science in 1986 from the University of Ibadan and another master's of education degree. She obtained her doctorate in library and information science from University of Nigeria, Nsukka (UNN) in 2000.

Career 

Achebe was the coordinator of the School of General Studies at UNN since 2002
chairman, Enugu State Library Board from 2005 to 2008
coordinator, American Corner Public Library
part-time director, John & Lucy Bookcafe (an NGO in partnership with The American Mission in Nigeria)
a professional project outreach for assisting people with literacy and information development.

She also belongs to professional bodies such as The Nigerian Library Association, International Federation of Library Associations and Institutions and International Association of School Libraries amongst others.

References 

Living people
Nigerian librarians
Women librarians
Academic staff of the University of Nigeria
People from Anambra State
University of Nigeria people
University of Nigeria alumni
1962 births